Jānis Geste (born 3 January 1983 in Užava) is a Latvian journalist and TV presenter. He was injured while reporting on the 2009 Riga riot. In 2012, he received the Latvian Journalists' Union Award for Best Young Journalist.

References

Living people
1983 births
Latvian journalists